Morphodaclyla is a genus of beetles in the family Carabidae, containing the following species:

 Morphodaclyla alticola Bates, 1891
 Morphodaclyla coreica Jedlicka, 1936
 Morphodaclyla ishikawai Nemoto, 1990
 Morphodaclyla potanini Semenov, 1889

References

Platyninae